Rupam Sarmah is a musician, filmmaker, entrepreneur, author, sound engineer, and computer scientist. Rupam is a Guinness World Records holder and had a #1 release on the Billboard World Music chart (Together in Peace, 2017). He won a Gold Telly Awards (One Little Finger, 2019). As a filmmaker, Sarmah has directed documentaries, short films, and feature films. Sarmah directed the English-language feature film One Little Finger with a theme of Ability in Disability.

Work 
Sarmah has worked with some of the award-winning artists and actors -- Siedah Garrett, Dan Aykroyd, Moloya Goswami, Tamela D'Amico, Abhinaya, Jaya Seal, Kushol Chakravarty, Asim Bose, Pabitra Rabha, Rituparna Sengupta, Debashree Roy, Paoli Dam, and others.

Rupam has produced, engineered, recorded songs and music with award-winning artists such as Quincy Jones, Siedah Garrett[3], Kathy Sledge, Julian Lennon, Janis Ian, Kechi Okwuchi, Pandit Vishwa Mohan Bhatt, Laura Sullivan, George Kahumoku, Jr., Cindy Paulos, Wouter Kellerman, Brian Vibberts, Ricky Kej, Sumitra Guha, Kevin Mackie, Sophia Agranovich, Alan Roy Scott, Udit Narayan, Babul Supriyo, Sadhna Sargam, Kumar Sanu, Rupankar, Subhamita, Swagatalakshmi Dasgupta, Usha Uthup, Anweshaa, Iman Chakraborty, and many others.

Sarmah and Sumitra Guha have represented India for Festival of India concerts in France (2018) organized by the Ministry of Culture, Govt. of India, and the Embassy of India in Paris on the occasion of India’s 70th Independence. The theme of the project was A Musical Journey towards Rising India.

As a Computer Engineer, Executive, and media professional, Rupam has worked for technology startups and other companies such as Apple.  Rupam is a Voting member of Grammy® as a Musician, Producer, and Engineer (P&E) since 2005.

Sarmah has been involved with AI, Autism, and Music research and started a research center (RMAN) for ongoing research.

Activism 
Sarmah founded the One Little Finger Global Foundation (501c3), Idea Incubation, and media production house maZumba for collaborative content creation. He has worked on a number of projects with organizations, including UNESCO-USFUCA, PRERONA, Manovikas - Welfare and Rehabilitation Center for the Children with Special Needs, Bhupen Hazarika Foundation.

Awards
Sarmah has received a number of awards and recognitions for his music and film. One Little Finger, written and directed by Sarmah, received several awards. His research-based world music project, OMKARA - The Sound of Divine Love and Gospel with Borgeet,Talk to God, received nominations in the Hollywood Music in Media Awards 2014.

Sarmah made a Guinness World Record on 24 February 2013 for his project 'A Musical Journey for World Peace', which united more than 500 participants from across the globe playing 315 kinds of musical instruments for world peace.

Chart performance
OMKARA was listed in the top 10 Radio Airplay chart.

Action Moves People United, co-produced and engineered by Sarmah, made the top 10 on the US Billboard Compilation Album chart.

The album A Musical Journey: Together in Peace made the top 10 on the Billboard World Albums chart. Sarmah created history by becoming the first Assamese and also probably the first artist of Northeast origin to get a #1 album on the Billboard World Albums chart.

Life 
Sarmah was born in Jorhat, Assam. He learned Indian instruments and classical vocals during his time at Golaghat and Jorhat. He also continued to explore other fields, such as film, sound engineering, and music. Sarmah migrated to the United States after completing his BS in Engineering in India. He then earned his doctorate from George Washington University's School of Engineering and Applied Science with a dissertation in Artificial Intelligence. Rupam completed his Master’s in Management, Master’s in Computer Science, and Doctorate from US universities. In the US, he took lessons from Ali Akbar Khan, Hindustani classical maestro. Rupam and his family currently live in California.

Filmography
ARISE TOGETHER - Video - I Am Brave by Dana | Gandhi's Grandson Speech  (Album Produced and Directed by Rupam Sarmah) [2022, Sep 23]
AUM - Blessings to Humanity - Music Video (track from AUM - The Divine Sound; Music Directed and Produced by Rupam Sarmah) [2021, Sep 24]
Enlighten Your Soul | Tribute to Gandhi, Mandela, MLK Jr. - Music Video (Music Directed and Produced by Rupam Sarmah [Oct 2, 2021]
One Little Finger (2019-2020) - Story, Screenplay and Direction by Sarmah
Gumsum Gumsum  - Music Video (Singers: Anweshaa, Rupam; Music and Direction by Rupam Sarmah) [2020]
O Mor Axomi Aai (Love for my country)  - Music Video (Singer, Songwriter, Direction by Rupam Sarmah) [2020]
O Maa Desh Amar  (Singer: Iman Chakraborty, Music: Rupam Sarmah, Bengali Lyrics: Gautam Susmit) [2020]
Gulsher Music Video (produced by Rupam Sarmah and Sharif Awan) 
Together in Peace - Mandela Meets Gandhi (produced by Rupam Sarmah and Sharon Katz) 
We Are Love (900 Voices) - Music Video: Participated in Grammy® winning composer Laura Sullivan’s project [2015]
In Search of God - Film Director (Rupam's debut film as a director; BEST DOCUMENTARY AWARD, Indian Film Festival, Houston, Texas); Music Score, composer, Sound Design
Sagar Kinare (Bengali) - Music Director
Alor Thikana (Bengali) - Music Director
A Musical Journey for World Peace - A Musical Concert Film, Directed by Rupam
Majestic Assam - Music Video
Story of Gulsher - Music Video
Art of Healing - Documentary, produced by Rupam (portrait of an artist, Lisa Sniderman)

Discography
ARISE TOGETHER - Co-Produced by Rupam Sarmah [2022]
AUM - The Divine Sound - Composed and Directed by Rupam Sarmah [2021]
AUM - ALOHA Blessings - Composed and Directed by Rupam Sarmah, feat. George Kahumoku, Jr., Cindy Paulos [2021]
One Little Finger (2019) - Rupam Sarmah featuring Quincy Jones, Siedah Garrett, Julian Lennon, Kechi Okwuchi, Vishwa Mohan Bhatt
A Musical Journey towards Rising India (2018) - Produced by Padmashri Sumitra Guha and Rupam Sarmah; Music Direction by Rupam Sarmah
A Musical Journey: Together in Peace (2017) - album composed, directed, produced by Sarmah
The Song Unsung (2016) - vocals by Janis Ian and Sarmah (words by Tagore, music inspired by Borgeet 'Pawe Pori Hori')
Story of Gulsher (2016) - a collaboration between India and Pakistan produced and composed by Sarmah
Mandela Meets Gandhi (2016) - a collaboration with Sharon Katz and The Peace Train (South Africa)
Action Moves People United (September 2016) - album with Dan Aykroyd, Kathy Sledge, Julian Lennon, Alan White, Annie Haslam, Lillias White, and others (Sarmah as Co-Producer, Singer, Composer, Engineer)
includes "Enlighten Your Soul" (2016) - with Dan Aykroyd, Alan White and others (composed by Sarmah)
Arise Above Abuse (Spoken Word and Music Album by Cindy Paulos and others) [2015]
Sounds from the Circle - New Age Album - compilation [2015]
OMKARA – The Sound of Divine Love (World Music Project based on Chakra and healing music) – Directed and Produced by Rupam (feat. Pandit Vishwa Mohan Bhatt, Sumitra Guha, Laura Sullivan, and others) [2014]
Talk to God (Contemporary Gospel song blended with Borgeet 'gopale ki goti'), Rupam Sarmah and Nona Brown, Singer and Composer [2014]
Angel Blessings (Benefiting Hospice): Take in a Deep Breath of Heaven (Rupam Sarmah and Nona Brown) [2014]
In Search of God - Singer, Direction and Score
Sagar Kinare (Bengali) - Singer and Music Director 
Hits of Rupam - Singer and composer 
Priyam (Assamese) - Singer and composer 
Gems of Bishnu Rabha, vol 1, 2, 3 (iTunes) - Sound Design 
Geetali (Assamese) - Singer and composer 
Piya Re (Hindi) - Singer and composer 
Praner Gaan - Singer and Composer 
Sylvan Rhapsody of Assam (iTunes) -  Sound Design 
Sangeetpremee - Singer and composer 
My Love Is You - Singer and composer 
Music Film (world record concert) – A Musical Journey for World Peace by Rupam and his team
 Bengali Album (Banjara)
 Bishnuprasadar Prosad (book – published) (assisted Dilip K. Datta, URI, USA)
 Bhupen Hazarikar Geet aru Jeevan Roth – (assisted Dilip K. Datta, URI, USA), published 2014

Notes

External links

 Rupam Sarmah's OMKARA
 
 Rupam Sarmah at Billboard.com
 [ Rupam Sarmah] at Allmusic

Living people
Indian film score composers
20th-century classical composers
21st-century classical composers
Indian male playback singers
People from Jorhat district
20th-century Indian musicians
Musicians from Assam
Indian male film score composers
20th-century Indian male singers
20th-century Indian singers
21st-century Indian male singers
21st-century Indian singers
Year of birth missing (living people)